The Húsavíkurkirkja is an early 20th century church in Húsavík, Iceland. The wooden church was built in 1907 by Icelandic architect Rögnvaldur Ólafsson, who designed the building in line with the Swiss chalet style. The church hosts marriages, baptisms, funerals, and an annual general meeting.

References

See also 
List of churches in Iceland

1907 establishments in Iceland
Churches in Iceland